Roger K. Kirby (born April 20, 1960) is an American politician. He is the member of the South Carolina House of Representatives from the 101st District, serving in the House since 2015. Kirby is a member of the Democratic party.  He is Assistant Minority Leader of the House. Kirby serves on the Labor, Commerce and Industry as well as the Legislative Oversight Committee.

SC House District 61 was held by Kirby, but after redistricting created a new geographic District, Kirby defeated Democratic incumbent Cesar McKnight in the June Primary and went on to win SC House District 101 unopposed.

Kirby joined House members Todd Rutherford and Deon Tedder in forming the Freedom Caucus of South Carolina, in contrast to the conservative SC Freedom Caucus.

Political career 
Kirby is a former member of the South Carolina State House's Rules Committee, and served as a member on the Subcommittee on Wildlife, the Subcommittee on Health and Healthcare Industries, and the Regulations and Administrative Procedures Committee. He was Secretary of the Agriculture, Natural Resources and Environmental Affairs Committee.

Electoral history

2014 SC House of Representatives
Kirby was the only Democrat to run in 2014, so there was no Democratic primary.

2016 SC House of Representatives
Kirby was the only Democrat to run in 2016, so there was no Democratic primary.

2018 SC House of Representatives
Kirby was the only Democrat to run in 2018, so there was no Democratic primary.

Personal life
Kirby was born in Florence County and currently resides in Lake City. He attended Furman University, graduating in 1982. He is married to Pam Horton Kirby, with whom he has three children: Amy Lee, Mary Katherine, and Elizabeth Ann. He is a realtor and appraiser, and he served as President of the Pee Dee Realtor Association in 2010.

References

Living people
1960 births
Democratic Party members of the South Carolina House of Representatives
21st-century American politicians